Ushirai Dara (also spelled as Usherai) is a sub-valley in Upper Dir District, Khyber Pakhtunkhwa, Pakistan. It is located at a distance of 25 km from the main town of Darora. The Ushirai Valley is jeepable from Darora Bazaar to Batal and culminates on Gurr Kohi where vehicular track ends of Ushirai Dara. The real adventure starts from Gur Kohi, where different tracking trails can be followed to the hill tops. The mountains around this valley are covered with tall cedar and pine trees and meandered by different streams and waterfalls. The famous and beautiful lake of saidgai Lake and comprising hospitable people attracts people from far to visit this scenic area. It comes under the administration of upper Upper Dir.

See also
Kumrat Valley
Laram Top

References 

Upper Dir District
Tourist attractions in Khyber Pakhtunkhwa
Tourism in Khyber Pakhtunkhwa
Populated places in Upper Dir District